James Howard Kunstler (born October 19, 1948) is an American author, social critic, public speaker, and blogger. He is best known for his books The Geography of Nowhere (1994), a history of American suburbia and urban development, The Long Emergency (2005), and Too Much Magic (2012).  In The Long Emergency he imagines peak oil and oil depletion resulting in the end of industrialized society, forcing Americans to live in smaller-scale, localized, agrarian (or semi-agrarian) communities. In World Made by Hand he branches into a speculative fiction depiction of this future world.

Background
Kunstler was born in New York City to Jewish parents, who divorced when he was eight. His family then moved to the suburbs on Long Island. His biological father was a middleman in the diamond trade. Kunstler spent most of his childhood with his mother and stepfather, a publicist for Broadway shows. While spending summers at a boys' camp in New Hampshire, he became acquainted with a small town ethos that would later permeate many of his works.

He lives in Greenwich, a town in Washington County, New York.

Education
In 1966, Kunstler graduated from New York City's High School of Music & Art, and attended the State University of New York at Brockport, where he majored in theater.

Career
After college, Kunstler worked as a reporter and feature writer for a number of newspapers, and finally as a staff writer for Rolling Stone.  During the 1970s and 1980s, Kunstler worked "a lot of odd jobs, from orderly in the psychiatric wing of the hospital, to digging holes for percolation tests in housing subdivisions".

In 1975, he began writing books and lecturing full-time. Kunstler's blog states that he has lectured at Harvard, Yale, Columbia, Dartmouth, Cornell, MIT, RPI, and the University of Virginia,  has appeared before professional organizations such as the AIA, the APA, and the National Trust for Historic Preservation.

Kunstler lectured on topics related to suburbia, urban development, and the challenges of what he calls "the global oil predicament", and a resultant change in the "American Way of Life." He lectured at the TED Conference, the American Institute of Architects, the National Trust for Historic Preservation, the International Council of Shopping Centers, the National Association of Science and Technology, as well as at numerous colleges and universities, including Yale, MIT, Harvard, Cornell, University of Illinois, DePaul, Texas A & M, the USMA, and Rutgers University.

As a journalist, Kunstler wrote articles for The Atlantic Monthly, Slate.com, Rolling Stone, The New York Times Sunday Magazine, and its op-ed page where he covered environmental and economic issues. Kunstler is also a supporter of the movement known as "New Urbanism."

His career peaked with the popularising of the concept of peak oil, for which he was a prominent spokesman, such as in the 2004 documentary The End of Suburbia. His 2005 book The Long Emergency became an oft-cited reference for the predicted imminent collapse of human civilisation. However, oil supplies increased due to fracking, and the collapse did not eventuate.

Political views
Kunstler is a harsh critic of both the Republican Party, describing them as "a gang of hypocritical, pietistic sadists, seeking pleasure in the suffering of others while pretending to be Christians, devoid of sympathy, empathy, or any inclination to simple human kindness, constant breakers of the Golden Rule, enemies of the common good." and also the Democratic Party and their "underhanded attempts" to get rid of Donald Trump, a man whom Kunstler sees as showing "strength". He was also a promoter of the concept of a so-called "deep state" working to overthrow and thwart Trump. He endorsed Trump for re-election and declared that he intended to do "everything he can to prevent the Democrats from winning the election."

In an interview with American Conservative, Kunstler attacked gay marriage, describing it as "cultural mischief" that would further damage "a struggling institution". He is a subscriber to the conspiracy theory that the 2020 United States presidential election was fraudulent, describing it as a "fraud-inflected election" on his website, and he suggests that the 2021 storming of the United States Capitol was the work of left-wing groups.

In recent times, Kunstler has had financial problems, and was described as "seethingly angry" about his writing income falling to only a few thousand dollars annually because of "the tidal wave of free content on the web". In addition, his "lucrative college speaking fees" have disappeared, which he blames on "the rising hysteria on campus against threatening ideas". Kunstler now uses Patreon to crowdfund his writing.

In an interview with Doug Casey published on October 13, 2021, Kunstler called the COVID-19 pandemic a "scam", and on October 11 he published the debunked vaccine conspiracy theory that the vaccine would kill people "steadily over the weeks and months" and went on to name hydroxychloroquine and ivermectin as "effective" treatments.

Writing
Over the course of the first 14 years of his writing career (1979–1993), Kunstler wrote seven novels.

Since the mid-1990s, he has written four non-fiction books about suburban development and diminishing global oil supplies. According to the Columbia Journalism Review, his first work on the subject, The Geography of Nowhere, discussed the effects of "cartoon architecture, junked cities, and a ravaged countryside". The book was described as a jeremiad by The Washington Post. Kunstler is critical of suburbia and urban development trends throughout the United States, and is a proponent of the New Urbanism movement. According to Scott Carlson, reporter for The Chronicle of Higher Education, Kunstler's books on the subject have become "standard reading in architecture and urban planning courses".

He describes America as a poorly planned and "tragic landscape of highway strips, parking lots, housing tracts, mega-malls, junked cities, and ravaged countryside that makes up the everyday environment where most Americans live and work." In a 2001 op-ed for Planetizen, he wrote that in the wake of 9/11 the "age of skyscrapers is at an end", that no new megatowers would be built, and that existing tall buildings are destined to be dismantled.

In his books that followed, such as Home From Nowhere, The City in Mind, and The Long Emergency (2005), he discussed topics in the context of a coming post-oil America. Kunstler says he wrote The Geography of Nowhere, "Because I believe a lot of people share my feelings about the tragic landscape of highway strips, parking lots, housing tracts, mega-malls, junked cities, and ravaged countryside that makes up the everyday environment where most Americans live and work".

In his science fiction novel World Made by Hand (2008), he describes a future dependent on localized production and agriculture, with little reliance on imports. Three "World Made by Hand" sequels have followed: The Witch of Hebron (2010), A History of the Future (2015), and The Harrows of Spring (2016).

Kunstler has written articles for the American Conservative magazine and syndicated weekly articles to the conservative Zero Hedge blog.

In his writings and lectures, he contends that there is no other alternative energy source on the horizon that can replace relatively cheap oil. He therefore envisions a "low energy" world that will be radically different from today's. This has contributed to his becoming an outspoken advocate for one of his solutions, a more energy-efficient rail system, and writes "we have to get cracking on the revival of the railroad system if we expect to remain a united country."

Reception
A 2020 article at NewGeography.com described one of Kunstler's essays in American Conservative as a "misanthropic, pessimistically aggressive Malthusian screed", and comments that Kunstler's "over the top act" shows him to be "survivalist masquerading as an urban geographer". The article points to Kunstler's growing appeal to conservatives due to the "overlap between libertarian conservatives and environmentalist zealots".

In 2005, conservative writer Bill Kauffman called Kunstler the "scourge of suburbia," and a "slashingly witty Jeremiah." In a 2008 review of Kunstler's weekly audio podcast, the Columbia Journalism Review described the KunstlerCast as offering "some of the smartest, most honest urban commentary around—online or off." The Albany, New York, Times Union reviewed Kunstler's book World Made by Hand, writing that, "James Howard Kunstler is fiddling his way to the apocalypse, one jig at a time." The paper described the book's scenario as "grim", with "an upside or two."

Critiquing The Long Emergency, journalist Chris Hayes claimed in 2010 that while Kunstler makes valid points about the consequences of peak oil, he undermines his credibility with rhetoric and perceived misanthropy. Joseph Romm, a climate change expert and Senior Fellow at the Center for American Progress, stated that accelerating shifts toward renewable energy will maintain suburban lifestyles and that, contrary to Kunstler's arguments, "suburbia won’t be destroyed by peak oil."

Charles Bensinger, co-founder of Renewable Energy Partners of New Mexico, describes Kunstler's views as "fashionably fear-mongering" and uninformed regarding the potential of renewable energy resources to eliminate the need for fossil fuels. In 2005 David Ehrenfeld, writing for American Scientist, saw Kunstler delivering a "powerful integration of science, technology, economics, finance, international politics and social change" with a "lengthy discussion of the alternatives to cheap oil."

Bibliography

See also
 Georgism
 Psychology of previous investment
 John Michael Greer

References

External links 

 
 
 Interviews with the author
 Chaos in the City. Architecture, Modernism and Peak Oil Production—James Howard Kunstler in Interview
 James Howard Kunstler Interview in MungBeing Magazine
 The American Conservative interview
 Resilience interview
 Terrain.org "Entropy Made Visible" interview
 TED Talks: James Howard Kunstler dissects suburbia at TED in 2004

1948 births
Living people
American bloggers
American non-fiction environmental writers
The High School of Music & Art alumni
Jewish American writers
Writers from New York City
People from Saratoga Springs, New York
State University of New York at Brockport alumni
Urban theorists
Activists from New York City
21st-century American non-fiction writers
New Classical architecture
New Urbanism
21st-century American Jews